St Marie may refer to:

Places 
 St. Marie, Wisconsin, a town in the United States
 St. Marie, Montana, a census-designated place in Valley County, United States
 , a former municipality in Finland
 , a district of Turku named after the former municipality
 , an island off the east coast of Madagascar
 Saint Marie (fictional island), in the Lesser Antilles which serves as the setting for the BBC crime drama television series Death in Paradise

Other uses 
 "St. Marie", 4th single from Stone Sour's 2017 album Hydrograd